Miss Rhône-Alpes is a French beauty pageant which selects a representative for the Miss France national competition from the region of Rhône-Alpes. Women representing the region under various different titles have competed at Miss France since 1928, although the Miss Rhône-Alpes title was not used regularly until 1987.

The current Miss Rhône-Alpes is Esther Coutin, who was crowned Miss Rhône-Alpes 2022 on 18 September 2022. Seven women from Rhône-Alpes have gone on to win Miss France.
Yvette Labrousse, who was crowned Miss France 1930, competing as Miss Lyon
Sylvie-Rosine Numez, who was crowned Miss France 1957, competing as Miss Saint-Étienne
Christiane Sibellin, who was crowned Miss France 1965, competing as Miss Lyon
Christiane Lillio, who was crowned Miss France 1968, competing as Miss Saint-Étienne
Sylvie Bertin, who was crowned Miss France 1988, competing as Miss Pays d'Ain
Laure Belleville, who was crowned Miss France 1996, competing as Miss Pays de Savoie
Sylvie Tellier, who was crowned Miss France 2002, competing as Miss Lyon

Results summary
Miss France: Yvette Labrousse (1929; Miss Lyon); Sylvie-Rosine Numez (1956; Miss Saint-Étienne); Christiane Sibellin (1964; Miss Lyon); Christiane Lillio (1967; Miss Saint-Étienne); Sylvie Bertin (1987; Miss Pays d'Ain); Laure Belleville (1995; Miss Pays de Savoie); Sylvie Tellier (2001; Miss Lyon)
1st Runner-Up: Sophie Hernandez (1984; Miss Lyon); Isabelle Vitry (1991; Miss Savoie); Virginie Dechenaud (2009)
2nd Runner-Up: Michèle Dumonteil (1961)
3rd Runner-Up: Ariane Quatrefages (1999); Nawal Benhlal (2000; Miss Lyon); Fanny Anselme (2002)
4th Runner-Up: Valérie Chouvet (1991; Miss Saint-Étienne Pays du Forez); Virginie Gaudenèche (2005; Miss Pays d'Ain)
5th Runner-Up: Florence Lefranc (1977); Delphine Brossard (1996); Florence Jacquinot (1997; Miss Pays d'Ain); Cloé Biessy (2007); Julie Jacquot (2012)
6th Runner-Up: Nadia Dumont (1993; Miss Pays de Savoie); Armonie Jenton (2008)
Top 12/Top 15: Marie-Pierre Damarin (1988); Sandrine Gaudin (1989); Rachel Detain (1989; Miss Pays d'Ain); Annabelle Excoffon (1990); Christelle Abry (1992; Miss Lyon); Nagège Pichol-Thievend (1992; Miss Savoie); Tiphaine Coulot (1994; Miss Pays de Savoie); Daphnée Delarche (1999; Miss Lyon); Tiphaine Guerineau (2000; Miss Pays d'Ain); Leslie Rouzier (2004; Miss Dauphiné); Émilie Arrault (2006); Edwige Tiare (2009; Miss Pays de Savoie); Nora Bengrine (2015); Dalida Benaoudia (2017); Anaïs Roux (2020); Charlotte Faure (2021); Esther Coutin (2022)

Titleholders

Miss Dauphiné
In 1985, 1993, and from 2004 to 2006, the departments of Drôme and Isère competed separately as Miss Dauphiné.

Miss Haute-Savoie
In 1976, 1986, 1987, and 1989, the department of Haute-Savoie crowned its own representative for Miss France. In 1978 and 1979, the title Miss Léman was used instead, while in 1977, the title Miss Léman-Haute-Savoie was used.

Miss Isère
In 1970, the department of Isère crowned its own representative for Miss France.

Miss Loire-Forez
From 1998 to 2009, the department of Loire competed separately as Miss Loire-Forez. Various titles were used to represent the department in the 1990s, including Miss Saint-Étienne, Miss Saint-Étienne Pays du Forez, Miss Nouvelle-Loire, and Miss Saint-Étienne Loire.

Miss Lyon
In 1928, 1929, 1964, and from the 1970s to 2000s, the Lyon Metropolis and department of Rhône competed separately under various titles, such as Miss Lyon, Miss Grand Lyon, and Miss Lyonnais.

Miss Pays d'Ain
In 1979, 1985, and from 1988 to 2005, the department of Ain competed separately under the title Miss Pays d'Ain. In 1986 and 1987, the title Miss Bresse Bugey was used instead, while in 1970, the title Miss Bugey was used.

Miss Pays de Savoie
From 1993 to 2014, the departments of Savoie and Haute-Savoie competed separately under the title Miss Pays de Savoie.

Miss Savoie
In 1986, from 1976 to 1979, and from 1990 to 1992, the department of Savoie crowned its own representative for Miss France.

Notes

References

External links

Miss France regional pageants
Beauty pageants in France
Women in France